The 1982 Lamar Cardinals football team represented Lamar University in the 1982 NCAA Division I-AA football season as a member of the Southland Conference.  The Cardinals played their home games at Cardinal Stadium now named Provost Umphrey Stadium in Beaumont, Texas.  Lamar finished the 1982 season with a 4–7 overall record and a 1–4 conference record.  The 1982 had a couple of firsts for the program.  1982 was the first season for the Cardinals to play at the NCAA Division I-AA level.  The 1982 season was also the first season with new head coach Ken Stephens.

Schedule

References

Lamar
Lamar Cardinals football seasons
Lamar Cardinals football